Fifty Shades of Grey is a 2011 erotic romance novel by British author E. L. James.

Fifty Shades of Grey may also refer to:
  Fifty Shades of Grey (film series), an American film trilogy series
 Fifty Shades of Grey (film), the first film in the series, 2015
 Fifty Shades of Grey (soundtrack), the soundtrack for the 2015 film

See also
 14 Shades of Grey, the 4th studio album by US rock band Staind
 "Fifty Shades of Grayson", an episode of the American series The Vampire Diaries
 Shades of gray (disambiguation)